Viken is situated in Höganäs Municipality in Skåne County, Sweden with 4,227 inhabitants in 2010. It has a surface area of 224 hectares. 223 of these are in the Höganäs municipality.

Well known for its harbour, the village has a long history of seafaring and fishing. It is also known for the distinctive, mostly yellow, seaside cabins lining its vast public beach.

Viken is known to have been the home of billionaire , who disappeared without a trace in 1994. Theories vary in terms of what happened. In 2005, he was declared dead by the Stockholm District Court.

Rune Andréasson, the creator of the Swedish comic character Bamse, lived and died in Viken.

Etymology
Viken is the definite form (the noun + the definite suffix -en) of the Old Norse word vík meaning an inlet or creek (UK).

Notable people from Viken 
Rune Andréasson - comic artist
Tove Lo - singer

References 

Populated places in Helsingborg Municipality
Populated places in Höganäs Municipality
Populated places in Skåne County
Coastal cities and towns in Sweden